Anax gibbosulus is a species of large dragonfly of the family Aeshnidae, commonly known as the green emperor. 
It inhabits swamps and brackish waters 
from India through northern Australia to the Pacific.

Anax gibbosulus is a very large dragonfly with a green body and dark brown tail with pale markings.

Gallery

See also
 List of Odonata species of Australia

References

Aeshnidae
Odonata of Australia
Odonata of Asia
Odonata of Oceania
Insects of Australia
Insects of India
Taxa named by Jules Pierre Rambur
Insects described in 1842